The 1998 Illinois State Redbirds football team represented Illinois State University  as a member of the Gateway Football Conference during the 1998 NCAA Division I-AA football season. Led by third-year head coach Todd Berry, the Redbirds compiled an overall record of 8–4 with a mark of 4–2 mark in conference play, placing second in the Gateway. Illinois State was ranked No. 16 in The Sports Network's postseason ranking of NCAA Division I-AA teams. The team played home games at Hancock Stadium in Normal, Illinois.

Schedule

References

Illinois State
Illinois State Redbirds football seasons
Illinois State Redbirds football